A by-election was held in the New Zealand electorate of Christchurch East on 30 November 2013. The seat was vacated following the resignation of Lianne Dalziel of the Labour Party from parliament, who contested and won the Christchurch mayoralty in October 2013.

Prior to the election, National's top party official in Canterbury had conceded that the by-election was "very, very hard for [National] to win". The by-election was won by Labour's Poto Williams, who prior to her selection as Labour's candidate was virtually unknown.

Background 
Following months of speculation, The Press reported on 20 April 2013 that Lianne Dalziel would challenge Bob Parker for the Christchurch mayoralty. On 19 June Dalziel formally confirmed that she would contest the mayoralty, also announcing that she would resign from Parliament, which would cause a by-election in the Christchurch East electorate. Dalziel's resignation took effect on 11 October, the day before the announcement of the mayoralty election-results.

Candidates
Ten candidates were nominated.

Poto Williams (Labour)
The Labour Party nominated Poto Williams for the by-election. In a surprise move, then Labour leader David Shearer appointed former MP Jim Anderton as the party's by-election campaign manager. The Labour Party nomination process started in August and Deon Swiggs was the first person to declare his candidacy. Swiggs, a 26-year-old who developed a profile following the 2011 Christchurch earthquake, has been a Labour supporter since age 15. A day later, James Caygill confirmed his candidacy to represent the Labour Party. He is the son of former Minister of Finance David Caygill. The third person to join the Labour candidacy race was Tina Lomax, who is the principal of Kingslea School and who, from 2004 to 2010, was a Burwood-Pegasus Community Board member. Karen Hayes is a registered nurse and midwife, Christina Laalaai-Tausa is a PhD candidate at the University of Canterbury, and the sixth candidate was Poto Williams, the regional manager of St John of God Hauora Trust. Clayton Cosgrove, an existing list MP who had lost the  electorate to National's Kate Wilkinson at the last election, had considered standing in the by-election, but in the end decided not to put his name forward for the Labour nomination.

Matt Doocey (National)

The National Party nominated political newcomer Matt Doocey for the by-election, who is a manager for the Canterbury District Health Board. The party's Canterbury Westland Regional Chair, Roger Bridge, noted that a sitting government has never won a by-election in an electorate that it did not already hold. Bridge later conceded that it would be "very, very hard for us to win". When Kate Wilkinson, National MP for the  electorate, announced in early November 2013 that she would retire at the end of the term of the 50th Parliament, rumours immediately surfaced that Doocey would replace her as National's Waimakariri candidate, and the Christchurch East by-election would help him gain experience in contesting an election.

Doocey is a member of the well-known Carter family. Family patriarch Maurice Carter, a Christchurch City Councillor for over 30 years (1956–1989), was his grandfather, and the Speaker of the House of Representatives, David Carter, is his uncle. Doocey grew up in Christchurch and attended St Bede's College for his secondary schooling. The Dooceys bought their current home in Redwood, which currently falls into the Waimakariri electorate, in April 2011.

David Moorhouse (Green)
The Green Party nominated software developer David Moorhouse for the by-election. He stood for the party in Christchurch Central electorate at the 2011 general election.

Other candidates
ACT Party
Gareth Veale was the candidate for the ACT Party. Veale is a 24-year-old earthquake claims specialist whose campaign is focusing on issues of crime and property rights.

Aotearoa Legalise Cannabis Party
Paula Lambert was the candidate for the Aotearoa Legalise Cannabis Party.

Conservative Party
The Conservative Party nominated Leighton Baker, a future leader of the party.

Democrats for Social Credit
The Democrats for Social Credit nominated Jenner Lichtwark, a novelist.

Independents
Three people were contesting the by-election as independent candidates. One, Adam Holland, previously contested the Ikaroa-Rāwhiti by-election, and says that he will be running on "a platform of donating the entirety of my parliamentary salary to the region". The other independent candidates are Ian Gaskin and Sam Park.

Blair Anderson, a former deputy leader of the Aotearoa Legalise Cannabis Party, considered standing as an independent, but did not put a nomination forward. He had previously stood unsuccessfully for the Christchurch mayoralty on several occasions.

Results

References

2013 elections in New Zealand
Christchurch East 2013
November 2013 events in New Zealand
Politics of Christchurch